Pied à Terre is a Michelin starred French restaurant in the Fitzrovia district of central London.

The restaurant is co-owned by David Moore who has been involved since the restaurant first opened its doors in 1991, with Richard Neat as the first head chef. Moore has had key roles or contributed to television programmes such as BBC's The Restaurant and Masterchef.

History
The opening on 16 December 1991 by part owner David Moore and head chef Richard Neat, saw the restaurant achieve Michelin star status after just thirteen months and then went on to double them in January 1996. When it was time for Neat to move on, Tom Aikens stepped into the limelight and retained the two stars until 2000. After Aikens' departure in December 1999, his own sous chef Shane Osborn took over the top position in the kitchen and furthermore became part owner. In January 2000, the restaurant was of one star status. Marcus Eaves who was head chef at L'Autre Pied earned his first Michelin star at the age of 27, just 14 months after L'Autre Pied opened its doors, took over the reins from May 2011. The current head chef Asimakis Chaniotis also comes from within the Pied stable of chefs and moved over from L'Autre Pied in September 2017.

In November 2004, a fire forced the closure of the restaurant for most of 2005, but it was re-opened on 26 September 2005.

See also
 List of French restaurants

References

European restaurants in London
French restaurants in the United Kingdom
Michelin Guide starred restaurants in the United Kingdom
Restaurants established in 1991
Fitzrovia
1991 establishments in England